The 2014 California State Controller election was held on November 4, 2014, to elect the State Controller of California. Incumbent Democratic Controller John Chiang was term-limited and ineligible to run for re-election to a third term in office.

A primary election was held on June 3, 2014. Under California's nonpartisan blanket primary law, all candidates appear on the same ballot, regardless of party. In the primary, voters may vote for any candidate, regardless of their party affiliation. The top two finishers — regardless of party — advance to the general election in November, even if a candidate manages to receive a majority of the votes cast in the primary election. Washington is the only other state with this system, a so-called "top two primary" (Louisiana has a similar "jungle primary").

In the primary, Republican Ashley Swearengin and Democrat Betty Yee finished first and second, respectively. The third-place finisher, Democrat John Pérez, initially called for a recount in 15 counties after official results showed him trailing Yee by 481 votes; however, he ultimately conceded to Yee more than a month after the primary. Swearengin and Yee contested the general election, which Yee won.

Primary election

Candidates

Democratic Party

Declared
 Tammy D. Blair, administrator
 John Pérez, Speaker of the California State Assembly
 Betty Yee, Member of the State Board of Equalization

Declined
 Bill Lockyer, State Treasurer and former California Attorney General

Republican Party

Declared
 David Evans, accountant, candidate for California's 22nd congressional district in 2006 and for Controller in 2010
 Ashley Swearengin, Mayor of Fresno

Withdrew
 Tina Mizany

Green Party

Declared
 Laura Wells, activist, retired financial and business analyst, nominee for Controller in 2002 and 2006 and nominee for Governor in 2010

Polling

Results

General election

Polling

Results

References

External links
California State Controller election, 2014 at Ballotpedia
Campaign contributions at FollowTheMoney.org

Official campaign websites
David Evans for State Controller
John Pérez for State Controller
Betty Yee for State Controller
Laura Wells for State Controller

State Controller
California State Controller elections
November 2014 events in the United States
California